Bruce Adamson has been the Children and Young People's Commissioner Scotland since 2017.

Early life
Adamson was originally from Palmerston North, New Zealand. He attended Palmerston North Boys' High School. At the Victoria University of Wellington he gained a Bachelor of Arts (majoring in History) and a Bachelor of Laws.

Adamson practised in the family and criminal courts in New Zealand before moving to Scotland in 2002.

Background
Adamson was part of the team when the Scotland's Commissioner for Children and Young People was set up in 2005.

He was a legal officer at the Scottish Human Rights Commission. and has worked as a member of Children's Panels.

In 2013 he was seconded to a position in Geneva with the Global Alliance of National Human Rights Institutions.
 representing institutions from over 100 countries working to improve human rights across the world.

Children and Young People's Commissioner
On 14 March 2017, Parliament approved his nomination.

Adamson has spoken in support of a ban of smacking and the raising of the age of criminal responsibility.

References

External links
 

Living people
People from Palmerston North
People educated at Palmerston North Boys' High School
Victoria University of Wellington alumni
Children and Young People's Commissioners in Scotland
Scottish civil servants
Year of birth missing (living people)